Medallion Air was a charter airline based in Sector 1, Bucharest, Romania. Its main base was Mihail Kogălniceanu International Airport.

In July 2013, the airline declared bankruptcy and list its license as part of financial insolvency.

Fleet
The Medallion Air aviation company went into bankruptcy in July 2013 and, as of this date, the Medallion Air fleet belonged to the new Romanian charter airline Ten Airways.

External links

Medallion Air Fleet

References

Defunct airlines of Romania
Airlines established in 2009
Airlines disestablished in 2013
Defunct charter airlines
2013 disestablishments in Romania
Romanian companies established in 2009